Mur or Mowr may refer to:
 Mur, alternate Romanization of Mohr, Fars
 Mur-e Jowkar, a village in Kohgiluyeh and Boyer-Ahmad Province
 Mur, Razavi Khorasan
 Mowr, Yazd